The Irresponsible Tour was the sixth comedy tour by American comedian, actor and producer Kevin Hart. The tour began on September 9, 2017 in Macon, Georgia at Macon City Auditorium and concluded on January 13, 2019 in Pensacola, Florida at The Pensacola Bay Center comprising 119 shows. It was filmed by Leslie Small for the comedy special Kevin Hart: Irresponsible (2019).

Background 
The 2017 leg of the tour was officially announced by Hart on his Twitter account on October 16, 2017. Hart stated "that is only the 1st leg of the tour, if you didn't see your city don't worry, I’m definitely making all stops #IrresponsibleTour". The 2018 portion of the tour was officially announced on January 29, 2018 via a trailer for the tour on YouTube. It was published by Hart's own network, LOL Network. Live Nation was also confirmed to be the sponsor of the tour.

Critical reception

Europe 
In a review for Go London, Bruce Dessau stated "Hart is tremendously amiable, while rarely venturing towards anything contentious. His edgiest riff tackled being the only black man holidaying on an Aspen ski slope until, much to his comedic chagrin, he bumped into fellow superstar Seal, 'during my black week'. Undemanding, uncontroversial, but undeniably funny." He reviewed the show at O2 Arena in London.

Shows

References 

Comedy tours